"I Don't Like" is the debut single by American rapper Chief Keef featuring fellow American rapper Lil Reese. Produced by Young Chop, it was released on March 11, 2012. The video for "I Don't Like" had over 28 million views on YouTube, before being taken down. The song was later remixed for the G.O.O.D. Music compilation album Cruel Summer.

"I Don't Like" was originally released on Chief Keef's third mixtape Back from the Dead on March 14, 2012. The song became available on iTunes on July 24, 2012 when Back from the Dead was officially released to digital platforms.

The music video was directed by DGainz, and was uploaded on his official YouTube channel on March 11, 2012. The video amassed over 30 million views before it was removed in August 2013. The video was re-uploaded on Chief Keef's Vevo account, where it has amassed over 100 million views as of March 2018. In late July 2020, the original video was restored on YouTube.

"I Don't Like" entered and peaked at number 73 on the US Billboard Hot 100. Elsewhere in the US, "I Don't Like" peaked at number 20 on the Hot R&B/Hip-Hop Songs and number 15 on the Rap Songs chart.  Complex named the song #7 on their list of the best 50 songs of 2012. In 2019, Pitchfork named "I Don't Like" the 13th best song of the 2010s.

Track listing 
 Digital single

Charts

Year-end charts

Certifications

GOOD Music remix

A remix featuring Pusha T, Kanye West, Big Sean, and Jadakiss was released on the G.O.O.D. Music compilation album Cruel Summer as "Don't Like.1". Chief Keef was under house arrest when the remix was recorded.

Certifications

References

2012 songs
2012 debut singles
Chief Keef songs
Interscope Records singles
Songs written by Kanye West
Hardcore hip hop songs
Songs written by Young Chop
Songs written by Chief Keef